In the 1973–74 English football season, Tottenham Hotspur competed in the Football League First Division finishing in 11 place. Tottenham were eliminated in the early rounds of the League and FA Cups but reached the final of the UEFA Cup, to which they lost to Feyenoord.

Season summary

Squad
Squad at end of season

Competition

League

League Cup

FA Cup

UEFA Cup

First round

Second round

Third round

Quarter-final

Semi-final

Final

Appearances 
League Statistics source:

Notes
Additional information added from the Official Tottenham Hotspur Handbook 2018–19.

References

Tottenham Hotspur F.C. seasons
Tottenham Hotspur